Amvrosiivka or Amvrosievka is a city and was the administrative center of Amvrosiivka Raion in Donetsk Oblast, Ukraine. , the population was approximately 

It is currently occupied by Russian and Donetsk People's Republic forces.

History 
It was first founded in 1869 as a train station settlement on the Kursk-Kharkiv-Azov Railway, and it received city status in 1938.  Since 1896, a cement factory is located within the city, and cement production has been the dominant industry of the city.  Also located within the city was a history museum, industrial technical school, 6 schools, 11 libraries, 9 hospitals, a pharmacy, a movie theater, a club, and a sport stadium.

The city's population peaked at approximately 24,400 in 1979.  By 2020, the State Statistics Service of Ukraine estimated the population has decreased to 

On July 15, 2014, two Ukrainian soldiers were killed and eight wounded when Amvrosiivka was hit by several "Grad" rockets.

On August 18, 2022, during the Russian invasion of Ukraine, a large Russian ammunition store in Amvrosiivka was attacked causing many explosions and fires that burned for several hours.  After 2:30 am local time, there were "massive explosions [followed by] multiple secondary detonations."

Climate

Demographics
Native language as of the Ukrainian Census of 2001:
Russian 71.3%
Ukrainian 27.9%
Armenian 0.3%

References

External links

Cities in Donetsk Oblast
Don Host Oblast
Populated places established in 1869
Cities of district significance in Ukraine
Populated places established in the Russian Empire
1869 establishments in the Russian Empire
Buildings and structures destroyed during the 2022 Russian invasion of Ukraine
Donetsk Raion